Ekim-Enen is a village in Uruan local government area of Akwa Ibom State, Nigeria. The Ibibio people are occupants of the Ekim-Enen village.

References 

Villages in Akwa Ibom